Foster William Hewitt,  (November 21, 1902 – April 21, 1985) was a Canadian radio broadcaster most famous for his play-by-play calls for Hockey Night in Canada. He was the son of W. A. Hewitt, and the father of Bill Hewitt.

Biography

Early life and career
Born in Toronto, Ontario, Hewitt attended Upper Canada College and the University of Toronto where he was a member of the Toronto chapter of the Beta Theta Pi fraternity. He was a champion boxer in his student years, winning the intercollegiate title at 112 pounds.

Hewitt developed an early interest in the radio and as a teenager accompanied his father, W. A. Hewitt, on a trip to Detroit, Michigan to see a demonstration of radio technology sponsored by General Electric.

He took a job with Independent Telephone Company, which manufactured radios, and left that job and university when his father—the sports editor of the Toronto Daily Star—told him that the Star was going to start its own radio station. Hewitt became a reporter at the paper, and was ready to go on the air when CFCA was launched. CFCA's first hockey broadcast was on February 8, 1923, although it was colleague Norman Albert who performed the play-by-play. Hewitt's first broadcast likely was February 16, of a game between the Toronto Argonaut Rowing Club and the Kitchener Greenshirts. Hewitt recalled the date as being March 22 in his own book, although there was no game scheduled for that night at the Arena Gardens. Hewitt's book also mentioned his first broadcast as being of a game between Parkdale and Kitchener, and the Argonaut Club was based in Parkdale, a neighbourhood of Toronto. He also mentioned that game as going into overtime which the Argonaut-Kitchener game did.

On May 24, 1925, Hewitt and his father made what was said to be the world's first broadcast of a horse race.

In 1927, he was invited as guest announcer to broadcast the first game from the new Detroit Olympia.

Hewitt was part of the opening night ceremonies for Maple Leaf Gardens on November 12, 1931, and the specially designed broadcast "gondola" where Hewitt would broadcast from was brought into the plans with his input, and the blessings of then Toronto Maple Leafs owner Conn Smythe.

Hockey Night in Canada
For forty years, Hewitt was Canada's premier hockey play-by-play broadcaster for the General Motors (Canada), then later Imperial Oil Limited, Hockey Broadcast on Saturday nights. As the show was aired on Canadian national radio, Hewitt became notable for the phrase "He shoots, he scores!" as well as his sign-on at the beginning of each broadcast, "Hello, Canada, and hockey fans in the United States and Newfoundland."

Hockey Night in Canada broadcasts from Toronto were simulcast on television from 1952 until 1963, with Hewitt handling the play-by-play up until 1958, at which point he handed the duties over to his son, Bill Hewitt. The elder Hewitt provided colour commentary of the Saturday night games after that, while continuing radio play-by-play of weeknight games. After 1963, Foster was solely on radio while Bill worked on television.

In 1951, he started his own radio station in Toronto, CKFH, initially at 1400 kHz, until moving to 1430 in 1959. The station carried Maple Leafs games until losing the rights in 1978. In 1981, the station was sold to Telemedia and was renamed CJCL. He made a bid at purchasing CHIN in 1970.

Later life
 Hewitt had retired from television in 1963, but continued to broadcast Leafs games on radio until 1968. In 1965, he became one of a group of owners of the WHL Vancouver Canucks, a minor professional hockey team. The following year, he and co-owner Cyrus McLean made a presentation to the National Hockey League asking the league to award them an NHL franchise, but their bid was rejected.

Hewitt came out of retirement to broadcast the 1972 Summit Series (with colour commentator Brian Conacher). Hewitt was inducted into the Hockey Hall of Fame as a builder in 1965. In 1972, he was made an Officer of the Order of Canada. The Foster Hewitt Memorial Award from the Hockey Hall of Fame is named after him, as is the media gondola at the nearby Scotiabank Arena. Hewitt's original gondola from Maple Leaf Gardens was dismantled, then dumped into an incinerator in August 1979 to make room for private boxes, under the MLG leadership of Harold Ballard.

Foster Hewitt was posthumously inducted into the Canadian Association of Broadcasters Hall of Fame in 1989 and the Ontario Sports Hall of Fame in 1996.

Personal life
He and his wife Elizabeth Kathleen How had a son, Bill Hewitt, and a daughter, Elizabeth Ann Somerville. Hewitt died of throat cancer on April 21, 1985 at the age of 82, at Providence Villa Nursing Home in Scarborough, Ontario.

In popular culture
A Canadian-style pub and grill restaurant was established in his name in Kaohsiung, Taiwan.

Justin Kelly portrays Hewitt in the season two episode "Radio Daze" of the Canadian Broadcasting Corporation's Frankie Drake Mysteries series.

See also
Notable families in the NHL

Notes

References
 
 
 
 
  Numerous reprints, 
 
 
Notes

External links 
 
 CBC Digital Archives - The Voice of Hockey: Foster Hewitt
 Foster Hewitt, History by the Minute

1902 births
1985 deaths
Burials at Mount Pleasant Cemetery, Toronto
Canadian radio sportscasters
Deaths from cancer in Ontario
Deaths from throat cancer
Foster Hewitt Memorial Award winners
Hewitt family
Hockey Hall of Fame inductees
National Hockey League broadcasters
Officers of the Order of Canada
People from Toronto
Radio pioneers
Toronto Maple Leafs announcers
Upper Canada College alumni